Kimbeley Yap is a road cyclist from Malaysia. She represented her nation at the 2010 UCI Road World Championships and 2011 Summer Universiade.

References

External links
 profile at Procyclingstats.com

Malaysian female cyclists
Malaysian people of Chinese descent
Living people
Place of birth missing (living people)
1985 births
Cyclists at the 2010 Asian Games
Asian Games competitors for Malaysia